Aigle Noir ("Black Eagle") may refer to:

Aigle Noir Makamba FC, Burundian football club
Aigle Noir AC, Haitian football club